Mandume (Dumbo) is a village in Bié Province, Angola, in southwestern Africa.

It was a strong point of the People's Movement for the Liberation of Angola during the Angolan War of Independence.

Notes

Populated places in Bié Province